The Würth Prize of Jeunesses Musicales Germany has been awarded since 1991 to artists, ensembles or projects who implement 's (JMD) values and objectives in an exemplary manner. Together with the Würth Foundation, the JMD has been honoring individual personalities, ensembles and projects every year. The prize is presented in Künzelsau and endowed with 25,000 euros. The jury is made up of representatives from the Würth Foundation and Jeunesses Musicales Germany and is advised by the Deutscher Musikrat (German Music Council). The JMD is the German section of the Jeunesses Musicales International (JMI). It was founded during the Second World War to encourage encounters between young musicians.

Recipients
Source:

 1991 – Dennis Russell Davies
 1992 – Arcis Quintet
 1993 – Philip Glass
 1994 – Nicaragua project of Dietmar Schönherr "Casa de los tres Mundos"
 1995 – Tölzer Knabenchor, Poznań Nightingales, Kühn Children's Choir Prague
 1996 – Yakov Kreizberg
 1997 – Junge Deutsche Philharmonie
 1998 – 
 1999 – Tabea Zimmermann
 2000 – National Children's Orchestra of Venezuela
 2001 – Claudio Abbado
 2002 – Ensemble Resonanz
 2003 – 
 2004 – Education Programm of the Berlin Philharmonic
 2005 – Philharmonie der Nationen
 2006 – 
 2007 – Artemis Quartet
 2008 – Gustavo Dudamel
 2009 – Arab-Jewish Youth Orchestra Israel
 2010 – Martin Grubinger
 2011 – Bundesjugendorchester
 2012 – Sol Gabetta
 2013 – Bruno Weil
 2014 – Deutsche Kammerphilharmonie Bremen
 2015 – vision string quartet
 2016 – Lars Vogt
 2017 – Christian Tetzlaff
 2018 – STEGREIF.orchester
 2019 – Patricia Kopatchinskaja
 2020 – 
 2021 – Jörg Widmann
 2022 – Notos Quartet

References

German music awards
Awards established in 1991
Classical music awards